Patpatar, or , is an Austronesian language spoken in New Ireland Province in Papua New Guinea.

Phonology 
Phonology of the Patpatar language:

References

Languages of New Ireland Province
St George linkage